A Submarine Service is the branch of a navy responsible for operating submarines.

 Argentine Submarine Force
 People's Liberation Army Navy Submarine Force (China)
 Royal Australian Navy Submarine Service
 Royal Navy Submarine Service
 Royal Netherlands Navy Submarine Service
 Submarine Forces of France

Submarine services